Vilambaram is a 1987 Indian Malayalam film, directed by Balachandra Menon and produced by K. G. Rajagopal. The film stars Balachandra Menon, Ambika, Saritha, Sukumari, Thilakan, Ashokan and Shari in the lead roles. The film has musical score by S. P. Venkatesh and lyrics by P. Bhaskaran.

Cast
 
Balachandra Menon as Advocate P. K. Namboothiri 
Ambika as Sheela 
M. G. Soman as Balagopalan 
Saritha as Sunanda Balagopalan
Shari as Valsala 
Sukumari as Mary 
Thilakan as James 
Ashokan as Basheer 
Sankaradi as Judge 
Baiju as Hotel Boy 
Jalaja as Razeena

Soundtrack
The music was composed by S. P. Venkatesh.

References

External links
 

1987 films
1980s Malayalam-language films
Films directed by Balachandra Menon